The former French Catholic Archbishopric of Arles had its episcopal see in the city of Arles, in southern France.

Diocesan history 
The bishopric of Arles was founded in 330. It was promoted a metropolitan archdiocese in 460, suppressed a first time to become part of the Metropolitan Archdiocese of Aix and restored shortly in 1816.

The Archbishopric of Arles was suppressed again, and incorporated into the Archdiocese of Aix in 1822. The latter is since officially called "Archdiocese of Aix (-Arles-Embrun)" and is no longer a Metropolitan but an archiepiscopal title, within the ecclesiastical province of Marseille.

Councils 

The first Council of Arles was held in 314, for the purpose of putting an end to the Donatist controversy. Bishops from the western part of the empire including three from Britain attended. It confirmed the findings of the Council of Rome (313), i.e. it recognized the validity of the election of Caecilian of Carthage and confirmed the excommunication of Donatus of Casae Nigrae. Its twenty-two canons dealing with various abuses that had crept into ecclesiastical life since the persecution of Diocletian (284-305) are among the most important documents of early ecclesiastical legislation.

A council held in 353, and attended, among others, by two papal legates, was decidedly Arian in attitude. The legates were tempted into rejecting communion with Athanasius and refused to condemn Arius, an act which filled Pope Liberius with grief.

A council was held on New Year's Day of 435, to settle the differences that had arisen between the Abbot of Lérins and the Bishop of Fréjus.

In the synod of 443 (452), attended also by bishops of neighbouring provinces, fifty-six canons were formulated, mostly repetitions of earlier disciplinary decrees. Neophytes were excluded from major orders; married men aspiring to the priesthood were required to promise a life of continency, and it was forbidden to consecrate a bishop without the assistance of three other bishops and the consent of the metropolitan.

A council of 451 held after the close of the Council of Chalcedon in that year, sent its adhesion to the "Epistola dogmatica" of Pope Leo I, written by Flavian of Constantinople (see Eutyches)

Apropos of the conflict between the archiepiscopal See of Vienne and Arles a council was held in the latter city in 463, which called forth a famous letter from St. Leo I.

Between 475 and 480 another council was called, attended by thirty bishops, in which the pre-destinationist teachings of the priest Lucidus were condemned.

In 524 a council was held under the presidency of St. Caesarius of Arles; its canons deal chiefly with the conferring of orders. A number of Caesarius of Arles' works have been published in Sources Chrétiennes.

Little is known of the councils of 554 and 682.

The liturgical uses of Arles were recommended by pope Gregory the Great as a model for Augustine of Canterbury.

An important council was held in 813, at the instigation of Charlemagne, for the correction of abuses and the reestablishment of ecclesiastical discipline. Its decrees insist on a sufficient ecclesiastical education of bishops and priests, on the duty of both to preach frequently to the people and to instruct them in the Catholic Faith, on the obligation of parents to instruct their children, etc.

In 1034 a council was held at Arles for the re-establishment of peace, the restoration of Christian Faith, the awakening in the popular heart of a sense of divine goodness and of salutary fear by the consideration of past evils.

From 1080 to 1098, Aicard continued to act as bishop even though he had been deposed. He was followed on the episcopal throne by Ghibbelin of Sabran, who was later Latin patriarch of Jerusalem.

In 1236 a council held under the presidency of Archbishop Jean Baussan, issued twenty-four canons, mostly against the prevalent Albigensian heresy, and for the observance of the decrees of the Lateran Council of 1215 and that of Toulouse in 1229. Close inspection of their dioceses is urged on the bishops, as a remedy against the spread of heresy; testaments are declared invalid unless made in the presence of the parish priest. This measure, met with in other councils, was meant to prevent testamentary dispositions in favour of known heretics.

In 1251, Jean, Archbishop of Arles, held a council near Avignon (Concilium Insculanum), among whose thirteen canons is one providing that the sponsor at baptism is bound to give only the white robe in which the infant is baptized.

In 1260 a council held by Archbishop Florentin decreed that confirmation must be received fasting, and that on Sundays and feast days the religious should not open their churches to the faithful, nor preach at the hour of the parish Mass. The laity should be instructed by their parish priests. The religious should also frequent the parochial service, for the sake of good example. This council also condemned the doctrines spread abroad under the name of Joachim of Flora.

In 1275, twenty-two earlier observances were promulgated anew at a Council of Arles.

Archbishops

Before 1000

 Trophimus of Arles (c. 250 – c. 280)
 Marcianus (m. 254/57)
 Marinus (bef. 2/10/313 – aft. 314)
 Saturninus (Arian; bef. 355 – 362/63)
 Concordius (m. 374)
  (m. 396)
 Heros of Arles (408–412)
 Patroclus of Arles (412–426)
 Helladius (426)
 Honoratus (427–430)
 Hilary of Arles (430–449)
 Ravennius (22/8/449 – aft. 452)
 Leontius (bef. 461 – aft. 475)
 Aeonius bef. 23/8/494 – aft. 29/9/500)
 Caesarius of Arles (503–542)
 Auxianus (542–546)
 Aurelianus (c. 546 – 551)
 Sabaudus (m. 552 – 586)
 Licerius (586–588)
 Virgilius of Arles (588 – betw. 601 & 610)
 Florianus (bef. 23/8/613, m. 614)
 Theodosius (bef. 11/8/632 – 650)
 Johannes I (bef. 660 – aft. 668)
 Felix (m. 680)
 Sede vacante (or no known bishops)
 Elifantus (bef. c. 788 – aft. 794)
 Johannes II (m. betw. 811 & 816)
 Notho (bef. 824 – aft. 835)
 Rotlandus (bef. 852 – 869)
 Rostagnus I (m. betw. march 871 & 904/13)
 Manasse (914 – 962/63)
 Iterius (m. 963 – )
 Anno

1000–1300

 Pons de Marignane (1005–1029)
 Raimbaud de Reillanne, Raimbaud, Archbishop of Arles (May 1030 – 18 February 1069)
 Aicard (1070 – 1080 or 1096?)
 Gibelin (1080 or 1099–1107, 1112 or 1115)
 Atton de Bruniquel (6 October 1115 – 6 March 1129)
 Bernard Guerin / Garin (1129 – 2 March 1138)
 Guillaume Monge (1139? – 1 January 1142)
 Raimon de Montredon (1142–1160)
 Raimon de Bollène (1163–1182)
 Pierre Isnard (1183–1190)
 Imbert d'Eyguière (9 October 1191 – 20 July 1202)
 Michel de Morèse (August 1202 – 21 July 1217)
 Uc Béroard (27 March 1218 – 18 November 1232)
 Jean Baussan (27 July 1233 – 24 November 1258)
 Bertran Malferrat, Bertrand de Malferrat (25 November 1258 – 25 May 1262)
 Florent (28 November 1262 – 7 June 1266)
 Bertran de Saint-Martin (11 October 1266 – June 1273)
 Bernard de Languissel (4 February 1274 – 1281)
 Bertrand Amalric (20 December 1281 – 31 March 1286)
 Rostaing de la Capre (5 August 1286 – 22 August 1303)

1300–1500

 Peire de Ferrières (30 January 1304 – 21 September 1307)
 Arnaud de Faugères (1307 – 1309 or 1310)
 Gaillard de Faugères (19 December 1310 – 12 September 1317)
 Gaillard Saumate (1318–1323)
 Gasbert de la Val /du Val (1324–1341)
 Jean de Cardone (1341–1348)
 Étienne Aldebrand (1348–1350)
 Étienne de La Garde (1351–1361)
 Guillaume de La Garde (1361–1374)
 Pierre de Cros (1374–1388)
 François de Conzié /Conzieu (1388–1390)
 Jean de Rochechouart (1390–1398)
 Pierre Blavi  Blau ?
 vacant 1398–1404
 Artaud de Mélan /Méhelle (1404–1410)
 Jean Allarmet de Brogny (1410–1423)
 Louis Aleman (December 1423 – 16 September 1450)
 Pierre de Foix (1450–1463)
 Philippe de Lévis (7 May 1463? – 11 November 1475) (also Archbishop of Auch)
 Eustache de Lévis (1475 – 22 April 1489)
 Nicolas de Cibo (1489–1499)
 Jean Ferrier I (1499–1521)

1500–1792

 Jean Ferrier II (1521–1550)
 Jacques du Broullat (1550–1560)
 Robert de Lenoncourt (7 February 1560 – 2 February 1561)
 Antoine d'Albon (1561–1562) (also Archbishop of Lyon)
 Hippolyte d'Este (1562–1566)
 Prosper de Sainte-Croix (1566–1574)
 Silvio de Sainte-Croix Silvio (1574–1598)
 Oratio Montano (1598–1603)
 Gaspard du Laurent (1603–1630)
 Jean Jaubert de Barrault (20 July 1630 – 30 July 1643)
 François Adhémar de Monteil de Grignan (31 March 1644 – 9 March 1689)
 Jean-Baptiste Adhémar de Monteil de Grignan (9 March 1689 – 11 November 1697)
 François de Mailly (24 December 1697 – 12 July 1710) (also Archbishop of Reims)
 Jacques II de Forbin-Janson (1711 – 13 January 1741)
 Jacques Bonne-Gigault de Bellefonds (20 August 1741 – 4 March 1746) (also Bishop of Bayonne and Archbishop of Paris)
 Jean-Joseph de Jumilhac (17 April 1746 – 20 February 1775) (also Bishop of Vannes)
 Jean Marie du Lau d'Allemans (1 October 1775 – 2 September 1792)

See also
Catholic Church in France
List of Catholic dioceses in France

Notes

Sources and External Links 

  p. 527. (in Latin)
 

 
 G-Catholic,  Arles

Arles
Arles
1822 disestablishments in France